Zaban Sambhal Ke is a 2018 Hindi web series sitcom created by Rajiv Mehra for Ekta Kapoor's video on demand platform ALTBalaji. The series stars Sumeet Raghvan as the protagonist who is the head master of Hindi speaking institute. The idea for the plot has been taken from Mind Your Language, the British sitcom from the late '70s. The series revolves around the hilarious miscommunication between the students due to language barriers.

The series is available for streaming on the ALT Balaji App and its associated websites since its release date.

Plot
The comedy series centres on a Hindi-learning class which has students from different nationalities and ethnicities.

Cast
 Sumeet Raghavan as Mohan Bharti, Professor of Hindi at NIL i.e National Institute of Languages
 Shoma Anand as Ms. Diwan, Principal of NIL
 Tanu Khan as Tara Parker, a former porn star from Los Angeles, USA
 Bakhtiyaar Irani as Perzin, a Parsi middle-aged bachelor
 Ashwin Mushran as Sheikh Al Fukar, an Arabian oil businessman
 Rupali Bhosale as Paro, a fish seller from Maharashtra
 Pipa Hughes as Jennifer, a social worker from France
 Mishka Sharma as Lin Dolo, from Aizawl, Mizoram
 Hemant Kumar as Balwant, a wrestler from Harayana
 Bhawsheel Singh Sahni as Money Singh, a Punjabi rapper
 Jimmy Moses as PMS, an MLA from Chennai who wants to become Prime Minister
 Meenakshi Chand as Rimjhim, a Bhojpuri actress
 Madhuurima as Bela Bose, Receptionist and Ms. Diwan's Secretary at NIL
 Rakesh Shrivastav as Pandey, Peon at NIL

References

External links
 Watch Zaban Sambhal Ke on ALT Balaji website

2018 web series debuts
Hindi-language web series
ALTBalaji original programming
Indian comedy web series
Works about educators